Archibald Johnstone Kirkwood, Baron Kirkwood of Kirkhope,  (born 22 April 1946) is a British Liberal Democrat politician.

Education
Kirkwood was educated at Cranhill Secondary School in Cranhill, Glasgow and studied pharmacy at Heriot-Watt University, gaining a BSc in 1971. He became a solicitor in Hawick and Notary public.

Parliamentary career
Kirkwood first joined parliament in 1971 as a parliamentary assistant as part of the Joseph Rowntree Social Service Trust (now the Joseph Rowntree Reform Trust) Political Fellowship Scheme. In 1971 he worked for David Steel MP in the office of the Liberal Chief Whip.

Kirkwood was the Liberal, and later Liberal Democrat, Member of Parliament for Roxburgh and Berwickshire from 1983 until 2005.

In 1986 he with two other MPs Simon Hughes MP and Michael Meadowcroft MP and the National League of Young Liberals and other parts of the party produced the booklet Across the Divide: Liberal Values on Defence and Disarmament. This was the rally call that defeated the party leadership in the debate over the issue of an independent nuclear deterrent. This led to Kirkwood and the other authors being jeered by other Liberal MPs and Peers at the 1986 Liberal Assembly.

A Chair of the Parliamentary Select Committee on Work and Pensions, Lord Kirkwood of Kirkhope, is listed in the House of Lords Register of Interests (Session 2006–2007) as the Chairman of the Unum Customer Advisory Panel for which he received payment from Unum. He received additional payments for other work for Unum.

Personal life
Kirkwood was knighted in the 2003 New Year Honours, and dubbed by the Queen at the Palace of Holyroodhouse on 3 July 2003.

On 13 May 2005 it was announced that he would be created a life peer, and on 10 June 2005 he was created Baron Kirkwood of Kirkhope, of Kirkhope in the Scottish Borders. He retired from the House of Lords on 2 September 2020.

He married Rosemary Chester on 30 December 1972. Lady Kirkwood died on 22 October 2019. They have a son and daughter.

References

External links
 Lord Kirkwood of Kirkhope profile at the site of Liberal Democrats
 Guardian Politics Ask Aristotle – Archy Kirkwood
 TheyWorkForYou.com – Archy Kirkwood
 The Public Whip – Archy Kirkwood voting record
  BBC News – Archy Kirkwood profile 10 February 2005

1946 births
Living people
Politicians from Glasgow
Scottish Liberal Party MPs
Scottish Liberal Democrat MPs
Kirkwood of Kirkhope
UK MPs 1983–1987
UK MPs 1987–1992
UK MPs 1992–1997
UK MPs 1997–2001
UK MPs 2001–2005
Alumni of Heriot-Watt University
Knights Bachelor
Members of the Privy Council of the United Kingdom
Life peers created by Elizabeth II
Politicians awarded knighthoods